"Hay Fever" is an episode of the BBC sitcom, The Green Green Grass. It was first screened on 30 September 2005, as the fourth episode of series one.

Synopsis

As Boycie and Marlene are only just dealing with the fact they have a gay bull and a miserable Welsh next door neighbour, they can't be doing with Tyler around the house all day and all night either. So they think it's time he started at his new school, to his total disgust. Meanwhile, Elgin orders a herd of cows as 'Farmer Boyce' instructed. But Marlene insists they buy only six cows and she is extremely annoyed when she arrives home and finds three hundred cows on the farm.

Episode cast

Production, broadcast and reception

Writing
This episode was written by John Sullivan, writer of Only Fools and Horses. The whole of the first series was written entirely by John Sullivan.

Broadcast
During its original airing, the episode had a viewing audience of 6.33 million, in the 8:30pm timeslot it was shown. This is the same audiences that sitcoms such as My Family attract.

This episode has since been re-run on BBC One, BBC HD and Gold. The show received one of the highest ratings of the week making it into the top thirty.

DVD release
The UK DVD release was released on 23 October 2006. The release includes the 2005 Christmas Special, a short special entitled 'Grass Roots' and a short documentary on 'Rocky'.

Continuity
Tyler starts at his new school to retake his GCSEs, a reference back to his rushed original taking of the exams is made.
Boycie purchases three hundred cows to Marlene's disgust, making reference to the events of the previous episode.
The Boyce family are still trying to deal with the fact that they have a gay bull, making reference to the previous episode.

Cast notes
This episode marks the second and final appearance of the Publican as played by Robert Putt.
This episode marks the second appearance of Llewellyn as played by Alan David.

Notes
 This episode marks the third in a story arc spanning several series in the form of the gay bull joke.

When Ged and Brian release Rocky into the field with the cows, they're in the field with him.  However, they're then seen approaching the gate outside the field whilst Rocky is in the field.

References

External links
British TV Comedy Guide for The Green Green Grass
The Green Green Grass at BBC Comedy

The Green Green Grass at Only Fools and Horses website

2005 British television episodes
The Green Green Grass episodes